By-elections to the 27th Canadian Parliament were held to fill vacancies in the House of Commons of Canada between the 1965 federal election and the 1968 federal election. The Liberal Party of Canada led a minority government for the entirety of the 27th Canadian Parliament, with little change from by-elections.

Seventeen seats became vacant during the life of the Parliament. Eleven of these vacancies were filled through by-elections, and six seats remained vacant when the 1968 federal election was called.

See also
List of federal by-elections in Canada

Sources
 Parliament of Canada–Elected in By-Elections 

1967 elections in Canada
1966 elections in Canada
27th